Nevis Mountain Dew is a 1978 play by American playwright steve carter . Set in the 1950s, it is the second of Carter's Caribbean trilogy. Nevis Mountain Dew explores the subject of euthanasia involving the patriarch of an affluent family who is confined to an iron lung.

Characters
 Jared Philibert The 50-year-old patriarch of an affluent Caribbean-American family.  Due to being afflicted with paralysis, he is confined to an iron lung.
 Everalda Philibert Griffin Jared's sister and the family member primarily responsible for his care.
 Zepora Philibert A younger sister of Jared.
 Billie Philbert The African American wife of Jared.
 Ayton Morris A family friend.
 Boise McCanles A co-worker of Billie's.
 Lud Gaithers Another co-worker of Billie's and Boise's friend.

Plot synopsis
Set in the Queens borough of New York City in 1954, a Caribbean-American family gathers to celebrate the 50th birthday of Jared Philibert, who is confined to an iron lung due to paralysis. Ayton, Jared's best friend, arrives at the party with a bottle of rum called "Nevis Mountain Dew." When people drink it, the rum seems to act as a truth serum.

Origins of the play
Nevis Mountain Dew is loosely based on the experience of a patient that the playwright encountered while working in a hospital. The play is dedicated to him.

Original off-Broadway production
 Directed by Horacena J. Taylor
 Produced by Negro Ensemble Company (NEC)
 Artistic Director: Douglas Turner Ward
 Managing Director: Gerald S. Krone
 Set Designer: Wynn P. Thomas
 Costume Designer: Alvin B. Perry
 Lighting Designer: Larry Johnson
 Press Representative: Howard Atlee
 Production Stage Manager: Clinton Turner Davis
 Opened: December 7, 1978, at St. Mark's Playhouse

Cast
 Graham Brown – Jared Philibert
 Frances Foster – Everalda Philibert Griffin
 Barbara Montgomery – Billie Philibert
 Ethel Ayler – Zepora Philibert
 Arthur French – Ayton Morris
 Samm-Art Williams – Boise McCanles
 Charles Brown – Lud Gaithers

Understudies
 Ethel Ayler
 Leon Morenzie
 Chuck Patterson
 Olivia Williams

Nevis Mountain Dew was selected among ten New York City productions as one of "The Best Plays of 1978–1979."

Washington, D.C., production
 Directed by Horacena J. Taylor
 Produced by Negro Ensemble Company (NEC)
 Opened: April 20, 1979, at Arena Stage:Kreeger Theatre

Cast
 Graham Brown – Jared Philibert
 Frances Foster – Everalda Philibert Griffin
 Barbara Montgomery – Billie Philibert
 Ethel Ayler – Zepora Philibert
 Arthur French – Ayton Morris
 Samm-Art Williams – Boise McCanles
 Charles Brown – Lud Gaithers

Los Angeles production (West Coast premiere)
 Directed by Edmund Cambridge
 Produced by Los Angeles Actors Theatre
 Opened: January 1982 at Los Angeles Actors Theatre

Cast
 Graham Brown – Jared Philibert
 Esther Rolle – Everalda Philibert Griffin
 Lee Chamberlain – Billie Philibert
 Roxie Roker – Zepora Philibert
 Lincoln Kilpatrick – Ayton Morris
 Hal Williams – Boise McCanles
 David Downing – Lud Gaithers

Comparison with Whose Life Is It Anyway?
Both Nevis Mountain Dew and Brian Clark's Whose Life Is It Anyway? were selected as one of the ten best plays of the 1978–1979 season in New York City. Each play tackles the subject of euthanasia through the eyes of a man that has become paralyzed.  Otis L. Guernsey Jr., editor of The Best Plays of 1978–1979 theatre yearbook, which recognized the two productions that season, made the following observation:"Nevis Mountain Dew of course invites comparison with this season's British script on much the same subject, Whose Life Is It Anyway?, and the NEC variation on this theme holds its own.  It doesn't confront its invalid's question "To be or not to be?" as polemically as its British counterpart, but it takes a similar stand and a closer look at the effects of such a  calamity on those surrounding the victim."

Awards and recognition
 1979: Selection, Burns Mantle, The Best Plays of 1978–1979
 1982 Los Angeles Drama Critics Circle Award – Lead Performance (Graham Brown)

References

External links
 
 L.A. Weekly review of 2008 Los Angeles production
 Post-Gazette review of 1999 Pittsburgh production

1978 plays
Plays by Steve Carter (playwright)
Euthanasia
Fiction set in 1954
Queens, New York, in fiction
African-American plays
Plays set in New York City